Smoking with Willis is an album by saxophonist Willis Jackson which was recorded in New York City in 1965 and released on the Cadet label.

Track listing 
All compositions by Willis Jackson and David C. Randolph (AKA Butch Cornell) except where noted.
 "Doin' the Mudcat" – 4:15
 "And I Love Her" (Lennon–McCartney) – 5:35
 "Goose Pimples" – 4:42
 "Yesterday" (Lennon, McCartney) – 3:08
 "Broadway" (Billy Byrd, Teddy McRae, Henri Woode) – 6:50
 "Who Can I Turn To?" (Leslie Bricusse, Anthony Newley) – 4:43
 "A Hard Day's Night" (Lennon, McCartney) – 5:35

Personnel 
Willis Jackson – tenor saxophone
 Franklyn Robinson – trumpet
Butch Cornell – organ
Vinnie Corrao – guitar
Bob Bushnell – bass
David Niskanan – drums

References 

Willis Jackson (saxophonist) albums
1966 albums
Cadet Records albums
Albums produced by Esmond Edwards